Michael John Weller (South London, 1946) is a British underground comics artist, political writer, cartoonist, activist and album-cover designer.

Weller designed the sleeve for the United States release of David Bowie's The Man Who Sold the World LP (Mercury, 1970), re-released (EMI CD 1999 and Metrobolist LP, CD, streaming formats, Parlophone, 2020). As "Captain Stelling" Weller wrote and drew The Firm (cOZmic Comics, 1972) - an early British artist's publication inspired by American underground comic book innovations. In 1973, a page by "Stelling" entitled 'Missile Crisis' was made part of Michel Choquette's comic book The Someday Funnies. In the 1970s Weller was published by Hunt Emerson for Birmingham Arts Lab press. He followed "Willie D" (Andrew Marr) as featured cartoonist on Chainsaw punk zine (1980–84).

Michael Weller enjoyed a parallel career in the 1980s and 1990s as political writer, cartoonist, activist of the left, and local community organiser based in Penge, south London. In 2006 he became a signatory to the Euston Manifesto.

As 'M.J.', 'Michael John', 'Mick' and 'Mike' Weller - using identity-playing forenames, nicknames and other noms-de-plume - he has produced artists books, comics, zines ("spineless wonders") and small press publications. Between 1990 and 2010 he was associated with London's poetry scene. Launch of Beat Generation Ballads was documented in video by Voiceworks (2011), becoming the title of a large-scale musical composition for piano by Michael Finnissy premiered at Huddersfield Contemporary Music Festival in 2014, winning a solo British Composer Award 2015.

Beowulf Cartoon has been on reading display at Poetry Library exhibitions Visual Poetics (2013) and Poetry Comics (2015).

Michael John Weller continues to write, draw, and publish for traditional print and digital mediums, including artists film and glitch.

Bookworks 
Harriet Staunton: A Victorian Murder Ballad, (Visual Associations, 1999)
Space Opera: The Artist's Book, (Visual Associations, 2000)
Madeline My Love In Death And Fancy, (Visual Associations, 2001)
Beowulf Cartoon, (Writers Forum & Visual Associations, 2004)
Three-part The Secret Blue Book, (homebakedbooks, 2005)
Slow Fiction: twenty-three tales in a box, (homebakedbooks, 2010)
Beat generation Ballads, (Veer Books, 2011)
minimus post ode poem, (zimZalla avant objects/object 021, 2014)
Metrobolist: Five Chapters, (homebakedbooks, 2015)
Three Piece Bathing Suit, (Blart Books, 2016)
Spurious Purple: 72 serial e-shots from 2016, (HomeBaked, 2017)
intermittent, (HomeBaked, 2018)
Old New Little Presses In The Age of Electronic Reproduction, (LUMIN, May 2019 objectzine edition)
Metrobolist 7, (Veer Books/bookartobject, April 2021)
An Open Letter To J.K. Rowling From You-Know-Who, (Yar Mouth Press, 2022 - 20th anniversary edition)

Selected comics, pamphlets and zines 
the bop that just won't stop!, 1979 Birmingham Arts Lab Press (Ar-Zak Microcomik 7)
Coffin' Blood, 1979
the power of rock n'roll zerox poemik, 1980
A SONG FOR EUROPE, sheet music, 1983 (Pop Laboratory)
Systemize, Buiiding a D-I-Y Cartoon System, 1985
Fantasy number one, 1990 (itma) ISBN 0-921205-24-2
Four-Eyed Flicks, 1993
The Fabulous Five, The comical story of the Arbiter, 1993
Too Much to Dream, 1994
Sugar Paper Rebellion, 1994 (visual associations)
Michael's Collected Chainsaw Cartoons 1980-1984, 1996 (visual associations) ISBN 0952813505
My Own Zine nos. 1 and 2, 1996-1997 (visual associations)
Sortilege of Allotment, 1997 (visual associations)
Detective Notes, Around the world with The Imaginative Traveller, 1997 
squad car Verethrangna, More Detective Notes (with Bill Griffiths and R), 1997 
YES WE WERE SECRET LOVER(S), (visual associations), 1997
The Ballad of Harriet Staunton, A Life Part 1: South London, 1998 (visual associations) ISBN 952813513
The Siege of Carlaverock, (with Bill Griffiths), 1998 (visual associations) ISBN 0952818564
b, 1998
The Boys Are Back In Town, 1999 (visual associations) ISBN 0952813572
k, 1999
G a poem of no more, 1999
Space Opera, a comic book series 1997-1999 (visual associations) ISSN 1367-0417
Passing Futures, 1999 (visual associations) ISBN 0952813580
W, 2000 (visual associations) ISBN 0953645908
Cobbled, 2000 (visual associations) ISBN 095364916
Sublimage, 2000 (visual associations) ISBN 095364924
Atterdake Ryst, 2000 (visual associations) ISBN 0953645932
Idiotgram, 2000 (writers forum) ISBN 11842540130
S Club 7 versus the Anti-Capitalists, 2000 (visual associations)
The Story of Republic Nine, 2000 (visual associations) ISBN 0953645959 
A Pigment of Imagination, 2001 (visual associations) ISBN 0953645975
Hitcloh Ilk, 2001 (visual associations) ISBN 0953645983
visual associations, 2001 (visual associations) ISBN 0953645991
Climb a Free Wheeler, 2001 (writers forum) ISBN 1842540327
Beowulf: An Old Old Story, 2002 (Scribblers Editions)
Stem Harvest, nature poems, 2002 (writers forum) ISBN 1842540698
An Open Letter To J.K. Rowling From You-Know-Who, 2002 (Scribblers Editions)
The Boy and Girl who looked up at the sky in wonder, 2005 (homebakedbooks)
Mike's Yellow Fever, 2005 (homebakedbooks)
Redell Olsen's Sharp Exhalations, 2005 (homebakedbooks)
Mechanically Inadvisable, the tale of Joe Shuster and Jerry Siegel, 2006 (homebakedbooks) 
My Own Zine nos. 1 and 2, 2006-2007 (homebakedbooks)
The Mother Of All Mermaids, a tale of magical realism, 2007 (homebakedbooks)
Andrea Brady Poetry Lady, 2008 (homebakedbooks)
Madeline My Love in Death and Fancy, 2009 (homebakedbooks)
Holly Pester Does It Better, 2010 (homebakedbooks)
Percy Bysshe Shelley's Masque of Anarchy Covered as a Zine, 2013 (homebakedbooks)
Grave's End, ghosting about horror, 2013 (homebakedbooks)
Zine Tales, 2013-2014 
Poetry Womble, 2017
Litleaf, 2014-2019

Further reading 
Word Score Utterance Choreography in verbal & visual poetry, edited by Bob Cobbing and Lawrence Upton (Writers Forum, 1998)
a WORD in your EYE, Steve Sneyd (Hilltop Press, 2000)
Comix, Comics & Graphic Novels: A History of Comic Art, Roger Sabin (Phaidon, 2001)
Comix: The Underground Revolution, Dez Skinn (Collins & Brown, 2004)
 MJ Weller's Secret Blue Book, Stephen Mooney (Readings webjournal Issue 3, Birkbeck University of London, 2008)  
Fanzines, Teal Triggs (Thames and Hudson, 2010)
British Comics: A Cultural History, James Chapman (Reaktion Books, 2011) 
The Alchemist's Mind, 'a book of narrative prose by poets' edited by David Miller (Reality Street, 2012)
Catechism: Poems for Pussy Riot, Mark Burnthorpe, Sarah Crewe & Sophie Mayer, editors (English PEN, 2012)
Artist's Book Yearbook 2014-2015, Centre for Fine Print Research, University of the West of England (Impact Press, 2013)
Comics Unmasked: Art and Anarchy in the UK, John Harris Dunning and Paul Gravett (British Library Publishing, May 2014)
The Other Room Anthology 7, edited by James Davies, Tom Jenks & associate editor Scott Thurston (The Other Room Press, 2015)
Psychedelic Suburbia: David Bowie and The Beckenham Arts Lab, Mary Finnigan (Jorvik Press, 2016)
The British Underground Press of the Sixties, James Birch & Barry Miles (Rocket 88, 2017)
Beowulf's Popular Afterlife In Literature, Comic Books, And Film, Kathleen Forni (Routledge, 2018)
BOWIEODYSSEY70, Simon Goddard (Omnibus Press, 2020)
David Bowie 1971 Shooting-Up Pie-In-The-Sky, Ivor Julian Jones (Mayak Publishing, 2020)

External links 
 Entry at the National Center of Contemporary Art, Kaliningrad
 Entry at Archive of the Now

British artists
British cartoonists
Underground cartoonists
1946 births
Living people
British activists
English male poets
Album-cover and concert-poster artists